Pope Benjamin of Alexandria may refer to:

 Pope Benjamin I of Alexandria, ruled in 623–661
 Pope Benjamin II of Alexandria, ruled in 1327–1339